Guilbaudtoppen is a mountain in Sørkapp Land at Spitsbergen, Svalbard. It has a height of 675 m.a.s.l. and is located east of the glacier of Olsokbreen, between Valettebreen and Brazybreen. The mountain is named after French pilot René Guilbaud

References

Mountains of Spitsbergen